WVOS (1240 AM) is a radio station broadcasting a classic hits format, simulcasting WVOS-FM 95.9 Liberty, New York. Licensed to Liberty, New York, United States, the station is owned by Vince Benedetto, through licensee Bold Gold Media Group, L.P.

One of the station's biggest news scoops was on July 20, 1969, when it broke the news that the Woodstock music festival was going to be held in Bethel, New York. The news broke even as Max Yasgur and the promoters were in a White Lake restaurant negotiating the details of the site. According to Woodstock lore, restaurant employees called the station during the meeting.

In 2010, the station was rebranded as Spanish-language: 1240 ESPN Deportes.

On September 1, 2014, WVOS changed their format from ESPN Deportes to a simulcast of classic hits-formatted WVOS-FM 95.9 Liberty, NY.

References

External links

VOS
Classic hits radio stations in the United States
Radio stations established in 1947
1947 establishments in New York (state)